Steppin: The Movie is a 2009 American musical comedy film. The film stars Wesley Jonathan and Chrystee Pharris, and was the last film directed by Michael Taliferro.

Premise
A college campus springs to life when the local radio station announces the official opening of the step competition season. As the fraternities and sororities work to recruit the best talent, the heat is on to win big prize money and campus bragging rights.

Cast
 Wesley Jonathan as Terrence Lawerson
 Chrystee Pharris as Jennifer
 Monica Allgeier as Vicki
 Anthony Anderson as Uncle Trevor
 James Avery as The Chancellor
 Chico Benymon as Bryan
 Lil' Fizz as Jay
 J-Boog as Greg
 Mo'Nique as Aunt Carla
 Darius McCrary as Sinis
 Reginald VelJohnson as Mr. Shavers
 Dorien Wilson as James Brooks
 Kellie Shanygne Williams as CeCe
 Sticky Fingaz as Cedric
 Shar Jackson as Uwamma Layne
 Miguel A. Núñez Jr. as James
 Clifton Powell as Detective Lewis
 Roz Ryan as Roz
 Big Tigger as himself
 Slim Thug as himself
 Ronnie Jackson as himself
 Ryan Acevedo as "Ry-Ry"

Production notes
Steppin: The Movie was filmed in Los Angeles, California, and at Prairie View A&M University in Texas.

External links
 
 

2009 films
2000s musical comedy films
African-American musical comedy films
American dance films
American coming-of-age films
American teen romance films
2000s English-language films
Films shot in Los Angeles
Films shot in Texas
2009 comedy films
2000s American films